Biography of the Life of Manuel is a series of novels, essays and poetry by James Branch Cabell. It purports to trace the life, illusions and disillusions of Dom Manuel,  Count of Poictesme (a fictional province of France), and of his physical and spiritual descendants through many generations.

Theme
The conceit of the series is that the life (or at least the expectations) of Dom Manuel 'the Redeemer', which is the subject of the novel Figures of Earth,  did not end in his death but was continued in his heirs. The life of each follows the same pattern.

The comedy is always the same. In the first act, the hero imagines a place where happiness exists. In the second, he strives towards that goal. In the third, he comes up short, or what amounts to the same thing: he achieves his goal only to find that happiness lies a little further down the road.
--The High Place : A Comedy of Disenchantment (1923)

Sequence
The components of the Biography were written between 1901 and 1929; some of them were originally conceived before Cabell had thought of Manuel and had to be rewritten to a greater or lesser extent to enable them to fit into the sequence. Although the Biography is a mix of fantasies, historical romances, social satires, verse, plays, and essays, Cabell said that he considered it a single work.

Bibliography
A table of works comprising the Biography follows. These data are given for each title:
 the date of its first publication, and of its revision (if any);
 an 'S' number (thus: S01) representing the volume of the uniform Storisende Edition, prepared under Cabell's supervision, published by R. M. McBride in 18 volumes between 1927 and 1930 (an asterisk indicates that the listed work formed only part of the volume);
 a 'B' number (thus: B15) representing the number of the work in the official bibliography of Cabell, prepared with his assistance by F. J. Brewer in 1957.

Some of Cabell's other books appear to have teasing references to the Biography. For example, the hero of Hamlet Had an Uncle (1927, B27) is the historical prince Horwendill, whose name suggests Manuel's nemesis, Horvendile.

Reception
Dave Langford reviewed The Silver Stallion for White Dwarf #49, and stated that "The Silver Stallion stands up well on its own: moving, erudite and very, very witty. [...] This and Jurgen are the best introductions to Cabell."

References

External links

"Science-Fiction and Fantasy Books by James Branch Cabell" by Eric Walker, Great Science-Fiction & Fantasy Works
The Cream of the Jest full text at University of Wisconsin–Milwaukee

Jurgen full text and other information at Library of Southern Literature
Notes on Jurgen, footnotes and references collected by enthusiasts in 1928, augmented by modern additions

Fantasy books by series
Novels by James Branch Cabell